The following is a chronicle of events during the year 1975 in ice hockey.

National Hockey League
Art Ross Trophy as the NHL's leading scorer during the regular season: Bobby Orr, Boston Bruins  
Hart Memorial Trophy: for the NHL's Most Valuable Player: Bobby Clarke, Philadelphia Flyers
Stanley Cup - Philadelphia Flyers defeat the Buffalo Sabres in the 1975 Stanley Cup Finals
With the first overall pick in the 1975 NHL Amateur Draft, the Philadelphia Flyers selected Mel Bridgman

Canadian Hockey League
Ontario Hockey League: The Toronto Marloboros defeated the Hamilton Fincups to win the J. Ross Robertson Cup.
Quebec Major Junior Hockey League:The Sherbrooke Castors won President's Cup (QMJHL) for the first time in team history
Western Hockey League: The New Westminster Bruins won President's Cup (WHL) for the first time in team history
Memorial Cup: Toronto Marlboros defeat	New Westminster Bruins

International hockey

World Hockey Championship

 Men's champion: The Soviet Union men's national ice hockey team won their 14th world championship.

European hockey

Minor League hockey
AHL: The Springfield Indians defeated the New Haven Nighthawks to win the Calder Cup
IHL: The Toledo Goaldiggers won the Turner Cup.
North American Hockey League: The Johnstown Jets won the Lockhart Cup
Southern Hockey League: The Charlotte Checkers won the James Crockett Cup
 Barrie Flyers win the Allan Cup

Junior A hockey
*

World Hockey Association

*

University hockey
 Michigan Tech won the NCAA Division I Men's Ice Hockey Tournament

Women's hockey
In 1975, the Bishop's Gaiters women's ice hockey team from Sherbrooke, Quebec, hosted the Women's Invitational Hockey Tournament. The 1975 participants included the Loyola Tommies, University of Toronto and Dawson College. The Loyola Tommies captured the championship, defeating Toronto in the final.

Deaths

Season articles

See also
1992 in sports

References